The 1974–75 English Hockey League season took place from September 1974 until April 1975.

The Men's Cup was won by Southgate. 

The Inaugural Men's National Inter League Championship brought together the winners of their respective regional leagues. The event was the predecessor of the National League and the championship (held in September 1975) was won by Bedfordshire Eagles in its first year. 

As from the 1980-81 season the National Inter League Championship would be held in the spring of the same season instead of the Autumn of the following season.

Men's Courage National Inter League Championship 
(Held at Aston University Grounds, Birmingham, September 13–14)

Group A

Group B

Final 

Bedfordshire Eagles
P Ball, M Blake, M Hodge, M Ganesh, Brajinder Daved, P Goodyear, P Ellis, Benawra Singh, R Jackson, M Kavanagh (capt), J Ashford
Southgate
David Owen, David Collison, David Whitaker, Anthony Ekins, R J Owen, Michael Corby, Alistair McGinn (Ian McGinn sub), Michael Crowe (capt), David Aldridge, John Walker, James Neale (G Pickard sub)

Men's Cup (Benson & Hedges National Clubs Championship)

Quarter-finals

Semi-finals

Final 
(Held at Goosedale Farm, Bestwood Park, Nottingham, on 27 April)

Southgate
David Owen, David Collison, David Whitaker, Anthony Ekins, Bernie Cotton, Michael Corby, Ian McGinn, Michael Crowe, (David Aldridge sub), John Walker, James Neale, t'Hoen
Nottingham
Sergeant, Watson, Appleby, Elson, Rivers, Stables, Walters, Cassell, Maughan, Stokes, Roper (Beck sub)

References 

1974
field hockey
field hockey
1975 in field hockey
1974 in field hockey